SELL (Syndicat des éditeurs de logiciels de loisirs) is a French organisation created in 1995 that promotes the interests of video game developers. It was founded by Infogrames' CEO Bruno Bonnell. The group mainly distributes information about video game professionals to authorities and consumers.

Video game classifications
From June 1999 until the arrival in 2003 of PEGI, the organisation rated the content of video games in France.

References

External links
 

Video game organizations
Video game content ratings systems
Arts and media trade groups
Video game trade associations
Video gaming in France
1995 establishments in France
Organizations established in 1995

Entertainment rating organizations